The Raytheon Phaser is a directed-energy weapon developed by Raytheon Technologies that uses high-power microwave electromagnetic energy to destroy hostile drones.

References

Raytheon Company products